Joaquín Pérez may refer to:
 Joaquín Pérez (equestrian) (1936–2011), Mexican equestrian rider
 Joaquín Pérez (rower) (born 1937), Cuban rower
 Joaquín Pérez (footballer) (born 2000), Argentine footballer
 Joaquin A. Perez (1916–1984), Guam politician